Delwar Hossain ( – 12 January 2023) was a Bangladeshi independent politician who was a Jatiya Sangsad member, representing the Barguna-1 constituency.

Life and career
Hossain was elected to parliament from Barguna-1 as an independent candidate in 2001.

Hossain died of kidney disease on 12 January 2023, at the age of 67.

References

1950s births
Year of birth missing
Place of birth missing
2023 deaths
8th Jatiya Sangsad members
Independent politicians in Bangladesh
People from Barguna district